Further Joy is the third studio album by American band, the Regrettes. The album was released on April 8, 2022, through Warner Records. The album moves away from the punk and riot-grrl sound established in their previous releases, and opts for a more upbeat, pop sound. It received critical acclaim.

Critical reception 

Further Joy received widespread critical acclaim by contemporary music critics upon release. On review aggregator website, Metacritic, the album has an average rating of 84 out of 100 indicating "universal acclaim based on five critic reviews". On AnyDecentMusic?, Further Joy has a 7.5 out of 10 rating.

Stephen Thomas Erlewine, writing for Allmusic gave Further Joy four stars out of five. Erlewine praised the tone and direction of the album saying "the thrust of Further Joy is unmistakably positive, an album where the Regrettes deliberately choose positivity instead of negative energy. This could've been a cloying direction if it weren't for Night's sharp skills as a songwriter, the palpable chemistry of the Regrettes, and the sleek shine of the production, each contributing to the exuberance of Further Joy.

Track listing

References 

The Regrettes albums
Warner Records albums
2022 albums